Dhothar is a village in Ludhiana District, Punjab, India. The name of village is after a Jatt clan Dhothar living here.
Jasbir Singh Tatla, the first turbaned Sikh in Canadian Air Force, came from this village.

External links
  Jasbir Singh Tatla of Chak Dhothar, the first turbaned Sikh in Canadian Air Force

  
Villages in Ludhiana district